The Jeju striped field mouse (Apodemus chejuensis) is a field mouse found only on Jejudo, an island in the northern East China Sea off the southwestern coast of South Korea.  It was originally described in 1965 as a subspecies of Apodemus agrarius.  However, a 1992 study of mitochondrial DNA found that it was in fact a separate species.

The Jeju striped field mouse is one of the most abundant mammals on Jeju. It has brown fur with an eel back, hence the name.

References

External links
 Photograph

Apodemus
Striped Field Mouse
Mammals of Korea
Mammals described in 1965
Endemic fauna of South Korea